Marinemobius is a genus of insect in subfamily Nemobiinae.

Taxonomy
The Orthoptera Species File database lists the following species:
Marinemobius asahinai (Yamasaki, 1979)

References

Trigonidiidae